Yallankoro-Soloba is a rural commune in the Cercle of Yanfolila in the Sikasso Region of southern Mali. The commune covers an area of 285 square kilometers and includes 8 villages. In the 2009 census it had a population of 11,722. The village of Soloba, the administrative center (chef-lieu) of the commune, is 32 km west of Yanfolila and only around 4 km from the Sankarani River that marks the border with Guinea.

References

External links
.

Communes of Sikasso Region